PGE Skra Bełchatów 2013–2014 season is the 2013/2014 volleyball season for Polish professional volleyball club PGE Skra Bełchatów. The club won 8th title of Polish Champion, lost in semifinal of CEV Cup and Polish Cup.

The club competed in:
 Polish Championship
 Polish Cup
 CEV Cup

Team roster

Squad changes for the 2013–2014 season
In:

Out:

Most Valuable Players

General classification

Results, schedules and standings

2013–14 PlusLiga

Regular season

Quarterfinal

Semifinal

Final
On April 27, 2014, took the third game. PGE Skra fought to win the title, and Asseco Resovia wanted to keep their chances of struggle and will equalize result. Hosts through effective game the whole team, and especially of captain Mariusz Wlazły, who was the Most Valuable Player in all three matches, won the third final match in three sets. PGE Skra won their 8th title of Polish Champion after two seasons break.

Polish Cup 2014

Quarterfinal

Semifinal

2013–14 CEV Cup

16th Finals

8th Finals

4th Finals

Challenge phase

Semifinals

End of season
On May 2, 2014, held the official end of the season for the club from Bełchatów. During the ceremony Konrad Piechocki summarized the season and officially said goodbye to wing-spiker Stephane Antiga, who after leaving the club became the coach of the Polish national team. Four months later, Antiga led Poland to title of the 2014 World Champions.

References

PGE Skra Bełchatów seasons